Abraham Redwood (February 15, 1709 — March 7, 1788) was a West Indies merchant, slave trader, plantation owner, and philanthropist from Newport, Rhode Island. He is the namesake of the Redwood Library and Anthenaeum, one of the oldest libraries in the United States. Redwood was the President of the Redwood Library and Anthenaeum from 1747 to 1788.

Early life and education 
Abraham Redwood Jr. was born on Antigua on February 15, 1709 at his father's plantation, Cassada Garden. Abraham Redwood Sr. was born in Bristol, England in 1665. In 1687, Redwood Sr. went to the island of Antigua where he married Mehetable Langford, daughter of Jonas Langford. It was through this marriage that Redwood Sr. came into the possession of the sugar plantation known as Cassada Garden which had "a great number of slaves." Abraham Redwood Jr. was the third of eleven children, following his two brothers William, (d. 1712) and Jonas, (d. 1724). Redwood Sr. remained in Antigua until 1712 when he moved with his family to Salem, Massachusetts. His wife Mehetable died in 1715. Until his death in 1729, Redwood Sr. traveled between homes in Antigua, Salem and Newport, Rhode Island.  

Abraham Redwood Jr. was educated chiefly by the Society of Friends in Philadelphia. On October 27, 1724, his older brother Jonas was thrown from his horse and killed, in Newport. Upon the death of his elder brother, Abraham came into the possession of the family sugar plantation in Antigua, Cassada Garden. In 1727, Redwood Jr. purchased land on Aquidneck Island and began building his country home, five miles north of Newport in Portsmouth. Sometime around 1730 he married Martha Coggeshall, of Newport, a descendant of John Coggeshall, one of the founders of the Colony of Rhode Island and Providence Plantations. Together Martha and Abraham had six children.

Redwood's botanical garden on his estate was known for its variety of curious and foreign plants, as well as indigenous plants. He ordered orange and fig trees, and adolescent guava and pineapple plants from the West Indies to fill his garden. Solomon Drowne wrote in 1767 that the garden was rumored to cost over forty thousand pounds, and that the gardener, Charles Dunham, received over one hundred dollars annual salary. Dunham was probably Newport's first professional gardener.

Cassada Garden 
During a voyage from Bristol to Antigua in 1687, Abraham Redwood Sr. married Mehetable Langford, the daughter of wealthy planter named Jonas Langford. Soon after his marriage, Redwood Sr. inherited the sugar cane plantation named Cassada Garden. Redwood Sr.'s oldest son, William, died in 1712 at the age of sixteen, and his second son, Jonas, was thrown from his horse in 1724, at the age of eighteen. Thus the third son, Abraham Redwood Jr., became the oldest living heir, and sometime after 1724, he inherited the estate of Cassada Gardens. The plantation brought Redwood an income between two and three thousand pounds a year.

The name Cassada appears to be a derivative from a cassava, a plant which produces large green leaves and a tuber that has long been a source of food for Indigenous peoples of the Americas.

Merchant and slave trader 
Both Abraham Redwood Sr. and Abraham Redwood Jr. were devout Quakers, but that did not prevent either of them from engaging in the Atlantic slave trade. In 1720, Abraham joined his father's business, working to not only maintain their sugar plantation in Antigua, but also the bilateral trade often referred to as the West Indies trade. As a part of this trade, Redwood sent timber and fish from Rhode Island to the Caribbean in exchange for molasses and hard currency. 

In 1736, a sudden drop in the price of sugar in London threatened Redwood with bankruptcy. Beginning in 1737, Redwood expanded his enterprise to include slave trading, becoming among the first of Newport's leading merchants to enter the slave trade. In that year, he financed a voyage to West Africa on his snauw Martha and Jane. Finding success, Redwood financed two more voyages on the Martha and Jane, one in 1738 and another in 1740. Each of these voyages traveled from Newport, Rhode Island to the Gold Coast and ended in St. John's, Antigua-- the site of Redwood's sugar plantation, Cassada Garden. In all, Redwood may have personally financed the enslavement of over three hundred people from the region of West Africa.

Redwood's 1740 slave voyage was his last one on record. However, his younger brother, William (1726-1815) and his son, Jonas (1730-1779) continued in the family business, financing four more voyages with William Vernon between 1756 and 1759. The ship used for their 1757 voyage was named Cassada Garden, after the family sugar plantation. These voyages enslaved an additional five hundred people into the Atlantic slave trade.

Slaveholder 
Abraham Redwood was one of Newport, Rhode Island's largest slaveholders. Diana Redwood (1739-1822) and Newport Redwood (1716-1766) are recorded as two enslaved people Redwood kept in Newport. The 1774 Census of Newport, Rhode Island records two presumably free African householders with the surname Redwood, Cuff Redwood and Phillies Redwood. Scipio and Oliver, two enslaved Africans Redwood kept on his plantation in Antigua, were burned at the stake for suspected involvement in a conspiracy to start a slave revolt in 1736. 

In 1775, the Society of Friends of Rhode Island, believing the Atlantic slave trade, and thus slaveholding, to be unchristian, formally asked Redwood to free the people he had enslaved. He refused, and the Quakers disowned him. Redwood's biographer, Gladys Bolhouse, writes that Redwood, now sixty years old, "whole livelihood as well as the inheritance of his sons depended on the plantation and the plantation could not be run without slaves."

Upon his death in 1788, Redwood left his enslaved people in Newport and Antigua to his children and grandchildren. On the 1774 Census of Newport, Redwood has three African people living in his home. An inventory of his Cassada Garden in Antigua showed that he owned two hundred and thirty eight enslaved people. In total, Redwood owned well over two hundred enslaved people, making him, at the time of his death, the largest slaveholder living in the city of Newport.

Philanthropy 

According to the Dictionary of National Biography, "Without a doubt the slave trade provided Redwood with the enormous profits that allowed him to become, as he was described at his death, 'the greatest public and private benefactor on Rhode Island.'" Following his donation of five hundred pounds sterling to fund the library's original book collection, on August 22, 1747, an act of the Rhode Island General Assembly incorporated the Redwood Library. Redwood's donation purchased over one thousand three hundred volumes for the new library. Several other prominent slave traders appear on the original list of forty-six proprietors, including William Vernon and Simon Pease. 

In 1764, Abraham Redwood was also one of the early benefactors of the College in the English Colony of Rhode Island and Providence Plantations, later known as Brown University.

Death 
In 1788, Abraham Redwood died at the age of seventy-nine. He is buried in the Coggeshall Burial Ground in Newport, Rhode Island.

See also 
 Aaron Lopez
 William Vernon

References 

1709 births
1788 deaths
People from Newport, Rhode Island
American people of English descent
18th-century Quakers
American slave owners
Philanthropists from Rhode Island
American planters
Antigua and Barbuda emigrants to the United States
People of colonial Rhode Island